Holešov is a town in Kroměříž District in the Zlín Region of the Czech Republic. It has about 11,000 inhabitants. The historic town centre with the castle complex is well preserved and is protected by law as an urban monument zone.

Administrative parts
Town parts and villages of Dobrotice, Količín, Tučapy, Všetuly and Žopy are administrative parts of Holešov.

Geography
The Rusava stream flows through the town.

The western and southern parts of the municipal territory with the town proper lie in a flat landscape of the Upper Morava Valley. The northern part with the villages Dobrotice and Tučapy lies in the Moravian-Silesian Foothills.

Climate

History

The first written mention of Holešov is from 1141 in a deed of Jindřich Zdík, when the settlement was a fief of bishops of Olomouc. Between 1300 and 1322, the market village transformed into a town.

In the second half of the 14th century, Holešov was acquired by the lords of Sternberg. In the late 16th century, the town was held by Karel Sr. of Zierotin and later by Ladislav IV Popel of Lobkowicz. In 1574, the local Gothic fortress was rebuilt into a Renaissance residence. Holešov suffered during the Thirty Years' War and in 1643, the castle and two thirds of the town were burned down. From 1650 to 1762, Holešov was owned by the Rottal family. During their rule, the town was reconstructed, and a large castle with a Baroque French-style garden and the Church of Assumption of the Virgin Mary were built.

The last owners of Holešov was the Vrbna family. After 1848, Holešov became the administrative centre of the Holešov District and the economic centre of the region. The town began to industrialize and the main industries were the woodworking, furniture, knitting and food industries. In 1960, the district of Holešov was dissolved.

Jewish presence
The first mention of Jewish presence in the town is from 1391. The Jewish community began to form here after 1454, when the Jews were expelled from royal towns. From 1849 until 1918, the Jewish community had its own administration separated from the town. In these times, the community participated on the town's industrialization and included successful entrepreneurs. The Jews almost disappeared from Holešov in the World War II as the result of the Holocaust.

The Old Synagogue was built after the local wooden synagogue was destroyed by a fire in 1560. The New Synagogue was built in 1893 and destroyed by the Nazis in 1941.

Demographics

Economy
The public airport of regional importance in the southern part of Holešov was transformed into the Strategic Industrial Zone, one of the largest industrial zones in the country.

Sights

Holešov is known for its large castle with the French-style garden complex and a game park. The early Baroque castle was built in 1655–1674. Today the castle is open to the public and houses also the town museum and gallery.

The landmark of the town square is the parish Church of Assumption of the Virgin Mary. The Baroque church was built in 1708 and consecrated in 1735. In 1748, the Black Chapel was added to the church. Under the chapel is the crypt of the Rottal and Vrbna noble families.

Trinitarian monastery is a valuable Baroque complex of buildings from 1748–1750. Its Church of Saint Anne was originally a part of the pre-castle complex.

The Old Synagogue is the second oldest synagogue in Moravia. It is an uncommon synagogue of the Polish type built in the Renaissance style which includes ornate ironwork and paintings on ceilings and walls using floral and animal motifs. The Old Synagogue, also known as the "Shakh" or "Šach" Synagogue, was preserved because it looked like an ordinary building from outside. Today it containts an exhibition about the life of Jews in Moravia.

The Jewish cemetery contains about 3,000 graves. The oldest preserved tombstones are from 1647.

Notable people
Jan of Holešov (1366–1436), writer, linguist, musicologist and ethnographer
Franz Xaver Richter (1709–1789), Austro-Moravian singer, violinist and composer
Josef Drásal (1841–1886), the tallest Czech ever; lived and died here
Mavro Frankfurter (1875–1942), Croatian rabbi
Oldřich Vyhlídal (1921–1989), poet and translator

Twin towns – sister cities

Holešov is twinned with:

 Desinić, Croatia
 Považská Bystrica, Slovakia
 Pszczyna, Poland
 Skawina, Poland
 Topoľčianky, Slovakia
 Turčianske Teplice, Slovakia

Holešov also cooperates with Gloggnitz in Austria.

References

External links

Official information portal

Cities and towns in the Czech Republic
Populated places in Kroměříž District
Shtetls